| highest attendance  = 18,408(Leicester Tigers v Gloucester)
| lowest attendance   = 2,500(Sale Sharks v Northampton Saints)
| tries               = {{#expr:
 + 6 + 6 + 14 + 6 + 11 + 7
 + 7 + 7 + 8 + 9 + 4 + 7 + 6 + 13
 + 3 + 5
 + 10 + 4 + 5 + 11 + 6 + 6 + 9 + 8
 + 7 + 9 + 7 + 12 + 9 + 8 + 7 + 11
 + 1 + 4
 + 4
}}
| top point scorer    =  Joe Simmonds (Exeter)54 points
| top try scorer      =  Joe Cokanasiga (L Irish) Dean Hammond (Worcester) Jonah Holmes (Leicester) Ken Pisi (Northampton)4 tries each
| venue               =  Kingsholm Stadium
| attendance2         = 
| champions           = Exeter Chiefs
| count               = 2
| runner-up           = Bath
| website             = 
| previous year       = 2016–17
| previous tournament = 2016–17 Anglo-Welsh Cup
| next year           = 2018–19 (Premiership Rugby Cup)
| next tournament     = 2018–19 Premiership Rugby Cup
}}

The 2017–18 Anglo-Welsh Cup was the 46th season of England's national rugby union cup competition, and the 12th and final to follow the Anglo-Welsh Cup format.  After this season it was replaced by the Premiership Rugby Cup and will played for by clubs from the English Premiership only.

The competition consists of the four Welsh Pro14 teams and the twelve Aviva Premiership clubs arranged in pools of three English and one Welsh team. English clubs were allocated to the pools depending on their final positions in the 2016–17 Aviva Premiership. Teams will play two home and two away pool matches, with teams in Pools 1 and 4 playing each other and teams in Pools 2 and 3 playing each other. The top team from each pool will qualify for the semi-finals. The competition will take place during the Autumn International window and during the Six Nations.

Leicester Tigers are defending champions after claiming the cup with a 16–12 victory over Exeter Chiefs in the 2016–17 final at Twickenham Stoop. This was Leicester's eighth title in the competition.

Teams & locations

Pool stages
Points system
The points scoring system for the pool stages will be as follows:
 4 points for a win
 2 points for a draw
 1 bonus point for scoring four or more tries in a match (TB)
 1 bonus point for a loss by seven points or less (LB)

Pool 1 v Pool 4

Round 1 (England)

Round 2

Round 1 (Wales)

Round 3

Round 4

Pool 2 v Pool 3

Round 1 (England)

Round 2

Round 1 (Wales)

Round 3

Round 4

Semi-finals

Final

Attendances
 Attendances do not include the final at Kingsholm.

Individual statistics
 * Note that points scorers includes tries as well as conversions, penalties and drop goals. Appearance figures also include coming on as substitutes (unused substitutes not included).

Top points scorers

Top try scorers

Season records

Team
Largest home win — 59 points
66–7 London Irish at home to Wasps on 27 January 2018
Largest away win — 40 points
40-0 Exeter Chiefs away to Scarlets on 12 November 2017
Most points scored — 66 points 
66–7 London Irish at home to Wasps on 27 January 2018
Most tries in a match — 10
London Irish at home to Wasps on 27 January 2018
Most conversions in a match — 8
London Irish at home to Wasps on 27 January 2018
Most penalties in a match — 5
Saracens away to Sale Sharks on 10 November 2017
Most drop goals in a match — 0

Attendances
Highest — 18,408
Leicester Tigers at home to Gloucester on 4 November 2017
Lowest — 2,500
Sale Sharks at home to Northampton Saints on 27 January 2018
Highest Average Attendance —

Lowest Average Attendance —

Player
Most points in a match — 21
 Freddie Burns for Bath at home to Leicester Tigers on 10 November 2017
Most tries in a match — 3 (2)
 Dean Hammond for Worcester Warriors away to Harlequins on 12 November 2017
 Joe Cokanasiga for London Irish at home to Wasps on 27 January 2018
Most conversions in a match — 6
 James Marshall for London Irish away to Cardiff Blues on 2 February 2018
Most penalties in a match — 5
 Max Malins for Saracens away to Sale Sharks on 10 November 2017
Most drop goals in a match — 0

References

2016-17
2017–18 rugby union tournaments for clubs
2017–18 English Premiership (rugby union)
2017–18 in Welsh rugby union